United Nations Security Council Resolution 350, adopted on 31 May 1974, established the United Nations Disengagement Observer Force, to monitor the ceasefire between Israel and Syria in the wake of the Yom Kippur War. UNDOF was initially established for a period of six months, but has had its mandate renewed by subsequent resolutions.

Resolution 350 was adopted by 13 votes to none, with China and Iraq not participating in the voting.

See also
 Arab–Israeli conflict
  Purple Line
 List of United Nations Security Council Resolutions 301 to 400 (1971–1976)

External links
 
Text of the Resolution at undocs.org
Report of the Secretary-General concerning the Agreement on Disengagement between Israeli and Syrian Forces (S/11302/Add.1)

 0350
 0350
Arab–Israeli peace process
May 1974 events